McMullen Branch is a stream in Jefferson County in the U.S. state of Missouri.

McMullen Branch has the name of the local McMullen family.

See also
List of rivers of Missouri

References

Rivers of Jefferson County, Missouri
Rivers of Missouri